The Landesliga Bayern-Nord was the sixth tier of the German football league system in northern Bavaria. Until the introduction of the 3. Liga in 2008 it was the fifth tier of the league system, until the introduction of the Regionalligas in 1994 the fourth tier.

The winner of the Landesliga Nord was automatically qualified for the Bayernliga, the runners-up needed to compete with the runners-up of Landesliga Bayern-Süd and Landesliga Bayern-Mitte and the 15th placed team of the Bayernliga for another promotion spot.

The league was disbanded in 2012, when the Regionalliga Bayern was introduced as the new fourth tier of the German league system in Bavaria. Below this league, the Bayernliga was expanded to two divisions while the number of Landesligas grew from three to five divisions. However, none of the new leagues carried the name Landesliga Bayern-Nord, with the Landesliga Bayern-Nordwest coming closest in territorial coverage.

Overview

The Landesligen in Bayern were formed in 1963, in place of the 2nd Amateurligas, which operated below the Bayernliga until then. In the region of the Landesliga Nord, the 2nd Amateurligen were split into three groups, Oberfranken, Unterfranken-Ost and Unterfranken-West. The league was formed from eighteen clubs, seven of them from the Amateurligas (III) and thirteen from the 2nd Amateurligas (IV).

In the first eighteen seasons, up until 1980, only the league champions were promoted to the Bayernliga. This was altered in 1981, when the three Landesliga runners-up were given the opportunity to earn promotion, too, via a promotion round. It took 14 attempts by a Landesliga Nord club however, to actually achieve promotion through this way, which VfL Frohnlach finally did in 1994. The Bavarian football association actually stipulates in its rules and regulations that every league champion has to be promoted, unless it declines to do so, and every runners-up has to have the opportunity to earn promotion, too.

Below the league, the Bezirksligas were set as the fifth tier of league football, until 1988, when the Bezirksoberligas were formed. In the first years, four teams were promoted from the Bezirksligas, two from each region. In the 1980s, this number was increased to five clubs for a time. The Landesliga Nord was now fed by the two Bezirksoberligen of Unterfranken and Oberfranken. The winner of those were automatically promoted, the runners-up played-off for another promotion spot, the loser of this game then played a decider with the 15th placed team of Landesliga to determine the winner of the last available spot in the Landesliga.

For the most part of its history, the league has operated on a strength of eighteen clubs, only occasionally diverting from this when the number of teams relegated from the Bayernliga to it was more than one. With the changes in the league system there were, on occasion, two automatical promotion places available to each of the Landesligs, like in the seasons 1993–94 and 2007–08.

Clubs based in the border region to Hesse traditionally play in the Hessen football league system rather than the Bavarian Football League System. Notable examples of this are Viktoria Aschaffenburg and FC Bayern Alzenau who both currently play in the Oberliga Hessen. The later only left Landesliga Nord to do so in 1992.

Disbanding
The Bavarian football federation carried out drastic changes to the league system at the end of the 2011–12 season. With the already decided introduction of the Regionalliga Bayern from 2012–13, it also placed two Bayernligas below the new league as the new fifth tier of the German league system. Below those, five Landesligas instead of the existing three were set, which would be geographically divided to limit travel and increase the number of local derbies.

The clubs from the Landesliga Bayern-Nord joined the following leagues:
 Champions and runners-up: Promotion round to the Regionalliga, winners to the Regionalliga, losers to the Bayernliga.
 Teams placed 3rd to 8th: Directly qualified to the Bayernliga.
 Teams placed 9th to 15th: Promotion round to the Bayernliga, winners to the Bayernliga, losers to the Landesliga.
 Teams placed 16th or worse: Directly qualified to the Landesliga.

Founding members
When the league was formed in 1963 as the new fourth tier of the Bavarian league system in Upper Franconia and Lower Franconia, in place of the 2nd Amateurligas, it consisted of the following eighteen clubs from the following leagues:

 From the Amateurliga Nordbayern
 FV Würzburg 04
 1. FC Bayreuth
 1. FC Michelau
 ATS Kulmbach
 TSV Gochsheim
 VfB Rehau
 Wacker Marktredwitz
 From the 2nd Amateurliga Unterfranken-West
 SV Großwallstadt
 TSV Lohr am Main
 Frankonia Mechenhard

 From the 2nd Amateurliga Unterfranken-Ost
 Bayern Kitzingen
 Post SV Würzburg
 1. FC Schweinfurt 05 II
 From the 2nd Amateurliga Oberfranken-West
 SC Sylvia Ebersdorf
 ASV Gaustadt
 From the 2nd Amateurliga Oberfranken-Ost
 VfB Bayreuth
 VfB Arzberg
 SpVgg Hof

The clubs in the two Amateurligas placed seventh or better were admitted to the new Amateurliga Bayern, all others went to the new Landesligas. The top-three teams in the four regional 2nd Amateurligas were each admitted to the Landesliga Bayern-Nord. In the case of the 2nd Amateurliga Oberfranken-West, the league champion, the reserve team of VfL Neustadt, was disbanded and the fourth place club in the league, TSV Küps, was not permitted to take its place.

Top-three of the Landesliga
The following teams have finished in the top-three in the league:

 Promoted teams in bold.
 The Bavarian football association requires deciders to be played when two teams are on equal points at the end of the season to determine promotion/relegation. While such games are common–place in the other two Landesligas, the Landesliga Nord never yet, as of 2009, had two teams finish on equal points on a promotion or promotion play–off spot.

Multiple winners
The following clubs have won the league more than once:

All-time table 1963–2012
The 1. FC Sand holds top spot in the all-time table of the Landesliga Nord, with 1,456 points from 928 games. Number two is the FT Schweinfurt, 46 points behind but with the record number of games, 1,060. Third place goes to 1. FC Bamberg. The last place, number 131, is the FC Wacker Trailsdorf on nine points. For the 2011–12 season, only one team joined the league that hasn't played at this level before, the TSV Kleinrinderfeld.

League placings since 1988–89

The complete list of clubs and placings in the league since the 1988–89 season:

Key

 S = No of seasons in league (as of 2011–12)

Notes
 1 In 1981, FV Würzburg 04 folded and reformed as Würzburger FV.
 2 In 1982, the SpVgg Bayreuth II withdrew from the league because the club's first team was relegated to the Bayernliga.
 3 In 1992, the FC Bayern Alzenau withdrew from the league and joined the Landesliga Hessen-Süd instead. In 2009, the club earned promotion to the Regionalliga.
 4 In 1997, the VfB Helmbrechts withdrew from the Bayernliga to the lower amateur leagues.
 5 In 2003, the TSV Gerbrunn withdrew from the Bayernliga to the lower amateur leagues.
 6 In 2007, the SV Aschaffenburg-Damm withdrew from the league.
 7 In 2000, VfB Coburg merged with local side DJK/Viktoria Coburg to form DVV Coburg. In 2011, the new club became insolvent.
 8 In 2006, the 1. FC Bamberg merged with TSV Eintracht Bamberg to form 1. FC Eintracht Bamberg. Prior to merger, results for the 1. FC are shown. The club became insolvent in 2010, folded, reformed as FC Eintracht Bamberg 2010 and continued playing in the Bayernliga. The reserve team however withdrew from the Landesliga.
 9 In 2005, the FC Bayern Hof merged with SpVgg Hof to form SpVgg Bayern Hof. League placings for SpVgg Hof are shown separately while placings for FC and SpVgg Bayern Hof are combined.
 10 In 2003, 1. FC Bayreuth and BSV 98 Bayreuth merged to form FSV Bayreuth. BSV 98 Bayreuth itself had been formed in a merger of VfB Bayreuth and TuSpo Bayreuth in 1968.
 11 In 1974, the SC Kreuzwertheim disbanded its football department.
 12 In 1972, the TSV Mainaschaff withdrew from the league.
 13 In 1965, the SV Großwallstadt withdrew from the league.

League records 1963–2012
The league records in regards to points, wins, losses and goals for the clubs in the league are:

References

Sources
 Die Bayernliga 1945 – 1997,  published by the DSFS, 1998
 Deutschlands Fußball in Zahlen,  An annual publication with tables and results from the Bundesliga to Verbandsliga/Landesliga, publisher: DSFS
 kicker Almanach,  The yearbook on German football from Bundesliga to Oberliga, since 1937, published by the kicker Sports Magazine
 Süddeutschlands Fussballgeschichte in Tabellenform 1897–1988  History of Southern German football in tables, publisher & author: Ludolf Hyll
 50 Jahre Bayrischer Fussball-Verband  50-year-anniversary book of the Bavarian FA, publisher: Vindelica Verlag, published: 1996

External links 
 Bayrischer Fussball Verband (Bavarian FA) 
 Das deutsche Fussball Archiv Historic German league tables 
 Bavarian League tables and results 
 Website with tables and results from the Bavarian Oberliga to Bezirksliga 

Nord
1963 establishments in West Germany
2012 disestablishments in Germany
Sports leagues established in 1963